Look What the Rookie Did is the debut album by Canadian band Zumpano, released in 1995. The album is available for listening online. Videos were released for the singles "The Party Rages On" and "I Dig You".

Production
The album was produced by Kevin Kane. It was recorded about two years prior to its release.

Critical reception
AllMusic wrote that "the freshness of Zumpano's sound, combined with adventurous melodies and rhythms, makes this an essential piece of work." Trouser Press wrote that "Zumpano is able to fight off the potential for coyness in its polka dot endeavors and ambitious enough to raise the ante with dramatic horns and pedal steel, treating period evocation as an intermediate goal rather than the stylistic finish line." The Washington Post wrote that "the proceedings are sometimes a little arch, but Zumpano and company usually marshal the melodies to keep their concept from flagging." CMJ New Music Monthly thought that "the sound is so perversely incongruous with everything else going on today, and is played with such unabashed garage-band innocence, that it actually sounds fresh, and you just can't help but be charmed." Exclaim! opined that Look What the Rookie Did "combines peerless tunefulness with instrumental complexity (guitars, keyboards, backing vocals and horns all stacked Yurtle high), topped with [Carl] Newman's incomparable, lispy vocals."

In a retrospective review, Magnet wrote that the album's "best songs ('The Party Rages On', 'Temptation Summary', 'I Dig You') were on par with the Brill Building breezy-listening pop that inspired them, possessing the sort of pristine, heartfelt, melancholy melodies that were all but banished from the airwaves by 1995."

Track listing
 The Party Rages On 
 Oh That Atkinson Girl 
 Rosecrans Boulevard 
 Platinum Is Best Served Cold 
 Evil Black Magic 
 Temptation Summary 
 I Dig You 
 Wraparound Shades 
 Snowflakes and Heartaches 
 Jeez-Louise 
 (She's a) Full-Blooded Sicilian
 Bonus Track

References

1995 debut albums
Zumpano albums
Sub Pop albums